Out of Oz is the fourth and final novel in Gregory Maguire's The Wicked Years and was released on November 1, 2011. Out of Oz brings a conclusion to the narratives spread across The Wicked Years while providing a revisionist look at L. Frank Baum's Land of Oz incorporating elements from Baum's series as well as the 1939 film adaptation of the original novel.  This novel presents an Oz in the middle of a civil war plagued with depression and adult situations, from the perspective of Rain, the young granddaughter of Elphaba Thropp, Maguire's reimagining of The Wicked Witch of the West.

Synopsis
Many years after Dorothy's departure, Oz has fallen into war. The Emerald City is now under the rule of Shell Thropp, the younger brother of Elphaba, while Munchkinland has seceded from the rest of Oz's union and the strife continues as Oz falls into a drought and Munchkinland has the only large body of water. Glinda the Good's estate rests on the border of Munchkinland, and soon the manor is overrun with soldiers from Loyal Oz, preparing to attack Munchkinland with dragons. Munchkinland is also preparing to attack Loyal Oz, and is desperately seeking the Grimmerie, a large tome of spells capable of catastrophic results. The only person ever able to read the book was Elphaba, but it is believed that perhaps her lineage may possess the same talent. After the events of Son of a Witch, Elphaba's orphaned bastard son Liir places his infant daughter into Glinda's care, and enchants her skin color so it loses its green tint.

Rain grows up as an ignored servant girl, but when Glinda acquires the Grimmerie and the Emerald City soldiers begin to show interest in Rain, Glinda knows it's time to part with them both. Glinda leaves the book and the girl in the charge of a company of a traveling puppet show, called the Clock of the Time Dragon. Among this show's crew is Brrr, the Cowardly Lion who is looking for redemption after his cowardly acts over the years. Brrr reunites Rain with her parents, but the reunion is short when it's brought to his attention that Dorothy Gale has returned to Oz, and is being placed on trial for the murder of Elphaba and her sister Nessarose. Knowing the Munchkins are after a scapegoat for the drought, Brrr is certain Dorothy will hang and travels with his companions – a dwarf named Mr. Boss and his wife, a Munchkin named Little Daffy, to rescue Dorothy. Rain is placed in hiding at an academy for girls, but crosses paths and becomes enamored with a mysterious boy named Tip. Eventually, Rain's father, the Grimmerie and Tip are all apprehended seemingly by the leader of the Munchkinland Revolt, and Rain is forced to take matters into her own hands.

Characters

Release details
Out of Oz was first released on November 1, 2011 in hardcover format by William Morrow in the United States, a paperback version was released simultaneously in Great Britain.

Literary significance and criticism
For the most part, reviews for Out of Oz were quite positive. Reviewers typically praised Maguire for wrapping up an epic series, Elizabeth Hand from the Washington Post wrote, "No summary could do justice to Maguire’s novel, which is hilarious, heart-wrenching and extremely poignant in its ending."   Brian Truitt from USA Today praised the series, though criticized it for its length, writing: "While it meanders at times, Out of Oz is a satisfying finish to the "Wicked Years" saga."

Notes

External links 
 GregoryMaguire.com - the author's official website, which includes a discussion forum.
 William Morrow, the publisher's website.

2011 American novels
2011 fantasy novels
Novels by Gregory Maguire
American fantasy novels
Oz (franchise) books
The Wicked Years
Sequel novels
Novels based on fairy tales
William Morrow and Company books